The 2000 CAF African Cup Winners' Cup Final was contested in two-legged home-and-away format between Zamalek and Canon Yaoundé, The first leg was hosted by Zamalek at Cairo Stadium in Cairo on 26 November 2000, while the second leg was hosted by Canon Yaoundé at Stade Ahmadou Ahidjo in Yaoundé on 10 December 2000.

Zamalek won 4–3 on aggregate, earned the right to represent the CAF at the 2001 FIFA Club World Championship, as well as participate in the 2001 CAF Super Cup against Hearts of Oak; the winner of the 2000 CAF Champions League.

Road to final

Match details

First leg

Second leg

References

 http://www.angelfire.com/ak/EgyptianSports/ZamalekAfr2000.html

African Cup Winners' Cup finals
2
CACWC
CACWC
African Cup Winners' Cup Final 
African Cup Winners' Cup Final 
African Cup Winners' Cup Final 
African Cup Winners' Cup Final